Acacia walkeri is a shrub of the genus Acacia and the subgenus Phyllodineae. It is native to an area in the Goldfields region of Western Australia.

See also
List of Acacia species

References

walkeri
Acacias of Western Australia
Taxa named by Bruce Maslin